Gert Muller may refer to:

 Gert Muller (rugby union, born 1986), South African rugby union player
 Gert Muller (rugby union, born 1948), South African rugby union player